The Ocoee Scenic Byway is a  National Forest Scenic Byway and Tennessee Scenic Byway that traverses through the Cherokee National Forest, in East Tennessee.  It is part of both U.S. Route 64 and U.S. Route 74, and features the Ocoee Whitewater Center and scenic bluffs along Ocoee River and Gorge.

Route description
The scenic byway traverses along  of US 64/US 74, as it routes along the north banks of the Ocoee River.  At Oswald Road (Forest Road 77), the  Chilhowee Scenic Spur climbs to the top of the Chilhowee Mountains.  Various boating/fishing activities can be done at Parksville Lake; while canoeing, rafting and kayaking can be done at the Ocoee Whitewater Center, venue of the 1996 Olympic Canoe/Kayak Slalom Competition when the Summer Olympics were held in Atlanta, Georgia. The majority of the route is two lanes, but a short segment east of the whitewater center is four lanes. Part of the four lane section was narrowed to two lanes before the Olympics to make room for stands, and the original eastbound lanes of that section are now used as parking for the Whitewater Center. The two lane sections are the only sections of US 64 in Tennessee that are still two lanes.

History

The route follows the Old Copper Road, originally a wagon trail dating back to the 1850s for transporting Copper from the Copper Basin area to Cleveland and Chattanooga. The Ocoee Scenic Byway was the first National Forest Scenic Byway in the nation, designated on July 22, 1988, by the United States Forest Service (USFS).

The route is prone to rockslides. The worst rockslide in the route's history occurred on November 10, 2009 near Ocoee Dam No. 2, blocking the route for months.

Due to the increasing rate of commercial traffic, TDOT has plans to replace the route with a new four lane highway. Multiple methods are being considered, including a route on the south side over the river and existing route, a route over nearby Little Frog Mountain, and a tunnel.

Junction list

See also

 Cherohala Skyway
 Foothills Parkway
 Natchez Trace Parkway

References

External links
 
 Cherokee National Forest

Transportation in Tennessee
National Forest Scenic Byways
Transportation in Polk County, Tennessee
Tourist attractions in Polk County, Tennessee
U.S. Route 64
U.S. Route 74
Appalachian Development Highway System
Historic trails and roads in Tennessee